Blyttia is a quarterly peer-reviewed scientific journal of botany published by the Norwegian Botanical Association since 1943. It was the successor of the Norsk Botanisk Forenings Meddelelser. The editor-in-chief is Jan Wesenberg. The journal is named after the Norwegian botanists Matthias Numsen Blytt (1789–1862) and his son Axel Gudbrand Blytt (1843–1898).

References

External links 
 
 Blyttia (journal) at SCImago Journal Rank
 Blyttia (journal) at HathiTrust Digital Library
 Blyttia (journal) at Botanical Scientific Journals

1943 establishments in Norway
Botany journals
Publications established in 1943
Quarterly journals
Norwegian-language journals